Chirothripoides is a genus of thrips in the family Phlaeothripidae.

Species
 Chirothripoides brahmaputrai
 Chirothripoides dendropogonus
 Chirothripoides faurei
 Chirothripoides hexodon
 Chirothripoidea hisakoae (extinct) 
 Chirothripoides malayensis
 Chirothripoides typicus

References

Phlaeothripidae
Thrips genera